The European League of Football (ELF) is a professional American football league. The league (as of the 2023 season) consists of 17 teams located in Germany, Poland, Spain, Austria, Italy, Switzerland, Hungary, Czech Republic and France, with plans to expand to 24 teams in 2025. The new league was officially created in November 2020, and kicked off on 19 June 2021.

History

The announcement of the league was met with skepticism from some Germans involved in the sport due to the failures of similar leagues in the past. The Chairman of the German Football League (GFL), Robert Huber, said, "...we have experience over the last forty years in running leagues in Germany and in Europe and we have a pretty good insight into what the teams are capable of". However, Commissioner Patrick Esume firmly believes that this league will succeed because "American football is experiencing a boom in Germany".

The first two new franchises to reveal their identity have been Ingolstadt Praetorians and Hanover-based team German Knights 1367, in early December 2020. They were followed by the Spanish team Gladiators Football, who also revealed they will play their games out of Costa Daurada, and will be coached by long-time CFL coach Adam Rita.

In March 2021, the league announced it has reached an agreement with the NFL, to be able to use the team names from the days of NFL Europe. On the same day, it was announced the franchises in Hamburg and Frankfurt will use the previous names of Hamburg Sea Devils and Frankfurt Galaxy. The Sea Devils also introduced their new head coach, former special teams coach for multiple NFL teams, Ted Daisher. It was then announced that the franchises in Ingolstadt and Hannover aren't ready to launch in 2021, so they were replaced with two new teams, in Leipzig and Cologne, and also that the franchises in Cologne, Berlin and Barcelona will use their names from NFL Europe.

In June 2021, the league announced a partnership agreement with the Brazilian Football Federation, Brasil Futebol Americano, that will see exchange opportunities for selected players, coaches and officials, as well as the possibility of organizing a match between the ELF and BFA champions in the future.

In July 2021, the league announced its inaugural All-Star Game, which will be held one week after the end of the season, on October 3 (German Unity Day), at Friedrich-Ludwig-Jahn-Sportpark in Berlin. It will feature a selection of the best players from the ELF, playing against the United States men's national American football team. Similar to the rules for rosters of individual teams, the all star team is limited to a maximum of four Americans of which only two can be on the field at any given time.

Goals
The ELF has said it hopes to bring back the excitement around American football that existed in the era of NFL Europe. Unlike NFL Europe, whose team rosters consisted of mostly American players, there will be restrictions to the number of international players allowed on rosters. There will be a bigger focus given to homegrown players, with the goal to develop the best of these players into NFL prospects. One way they plan on doing this is by creating an "ELF Academy". While ELF franchises will not have "youth teams", CEO Zeljko Karajica says that the academy will "...give players the opportunity to make the next step", which would be the skills to succeed in the ELF and compete for a spot on an NFL team.

Rules
The ELF plays with modified NFL rules, except for the overtime, where it uses college football's rules. Unlike most European sports leagues (including European American football leagues) a game that is still tied at the end of regulation during the regular season goes to overtime. However, no overtime was actually played in the inaugural 2021 season as all games had a winner after regulation. During the regular season of the inaugural 2021 season, the ELF did not have instant replay or other forms of Replay review in gridiron football (such as "Coach's challenge"); however, this feature was introduced for the 2021 ELF Bowl as well as announced for the upcoming season.

On 30 November 2021, the official Twitter account of the European League of Football announced a new kickoff rule. The new rule sees the kicking team’s players, except the kicker, line up on its opponent’s 35-yard line, while the receiving teams players, except the returner, line up on their own 30-yard line. Both teams are only allowed to move when the ball has either been touched by the returner or three seconds after the ball has touched the ground. This rule is nearly identical to the kickoff rule used by the 2020 iteration of the XFL. Only the requirement, that the ball must be kicked between the receiving team’s 20-yard line and endzone, is, at this time, not a part of the rule. The main cited reason for the rule change is player safety.

Officiating
Officiating in the ELF is comparable to the NFL. Head of officiation since the first season 2021 is former German Football League official Kurt Paulus. In this role, he is in charge of training and organizing the officiating crews for the individual game days. Furthermore, the head of officiating and its deputies are consulting the commissioner and Competition Committee for rule changes and new rules.

Officiating crews consists of seven on-field-officials and are staying together for a season. During a game they are connected via intercom and communicating in English language. In the 2022 season the different referees are coming from 16 different European countries. With the exception of the GFL and its governing body, referees officiating in the ELF are allowed to participate in national leagues in the ELF-offseason.

Officials in the ELF don't wear numbers on their jerseys.

Salary
Rosters consist of a maximum of 50 players, plus another 10 on the practice squad. Because homegrown players are one of the main focus points of the league, there are limitations for the numbers of foreigners. Each roster can only have a maximum of four U.S., Canadian, Mexican or Japanese players ("A-players"), and a maximum of 10 other foreign players for the 2021 season, which was then reduced to eight players for the 2022 season. However, the Bosman ruling prevents discrimination against EU citizens in EU based sports teams and leagues. Brazilian players didn't count towards the import quota due to the league's partnership with Liga BFA in the 2021 season.

The league has a salary cap for all franchises which is divided into three salary groups for its players. Up to eight players—including the four A-import spots—being paid full-time salary. For American "import" players a franchise can pay a salary that can range from €600 (around $700) to €3,000 ($3,500) per month. The second tier consists of additional four transitional players (international or homegrown) with part-time salary. Every other member of the roster is in the homegrown salary group with marginal employment and a monthly income ranging from 100€ to 450€. All players under contract are getting health insurance and participate in state pension insurance. Further benefits such as housing, meals and other memberships during the season have to be negotiated individually.

Teams 

The European League of Football has 17 teams in three conferences, across 9 countries: 8 in Germany, 2 in Austria, and 1 each in Czechia, France, Hungary, Italy, Poland, Spain and Switzerland. The ELF began with 8 teams in inaugural season in 2021. This included the Wroclaw Panthers from the Polish American Football League, and seven new franchises: the Berlin Thunder, Cologne Centurions, Frankfurt Galaxy, Hamburg Sea Devils, Leipzig Kings and Stuttgart Surge in Germany, and Barcelona Dragons in Spain. The goal of the league is to expand to at least 24 teams from 10 countries in the future. As early as 2021, Austria, France, and England were identified as markets interested in expansion franchises, and the London Warriors in particular expressed an interest in joining the league. 

The Vienna Vikings and Tyrolean Raiders from the Austrian Football League, and the Istanbul Rams from the Turkish Football League joined in the 2022 season, though the Rams dropped out after the season's conclusion. A reformed Rhein Fire inspired by the historical team from NFL Europe also joined during the 2022 season after much speculation and anticipation from fans throughout the previous season. Though a feud with the Italian Football League initially precluded an Italian expansion franchise, an agreement was eventually made that allowed the Milano Seamen to join the ELF in the 2023 season, which will also see the Fehérvár Enthroners from the Hungarian Football League and Prague Lions from the Czech League of American Football join, along with three new franchises: the Helvetic Guards from Switzerland, Munich Ravens from Germany and Paris Musketeers from France.

Current teams

Former

Champions

Championship Games

ELF All Star Game

Broadcasting

For the inaugural season, the league signed a deal to have 13 games, including the playoffs and championship game, broadcast live in Germany, Austria and Switzerland on ProSieben Maxx, with all other games streamed live on ran.de and More Than Sports TV. All games are also available worldwide, on the league's website, service provided by British company StreamAMG.

References

External links

American football leagues in Europe
Sports leagues established in 2020
2020 establishments in Europe